Alaina Burnett (born December 6, 1977) is a Canadian voice actress from Vancouver, British Columbia, Canada.

Roles
Earth Girl Arjuna – Kaine Ariyoshi
Infinite Ryvius – Ran Luckmolde
Inuyasha – Izayoi, Mu-on'na (Unmother)
Inuyasha the Movie: Swords of an Honorable Ruler – Izayoi
Mobile Suit Gundam – Sayla Mass
Mobile Suit Gundam: Char's Counterattack – Cheimin Noah
Zoids: New Century – Pierce
Master Keaton – Akemi

References

External links

1977 births
Actresses from Vancouver
Canadian video game actresses
Canadian voice actresses
Living people
21st-century Canadian actresses